Joel David Smallbone (born 5 June 1984) is an Australian singer and actor. He is a member of the Christian pop duo for King & Country along with his brother Luke Smallbone. He played the role of James Stevens in the 2016 film Priceless.

Early life
Smallbone was born in Sydney, but moved to Nashville, Tennessee in 1991. He is the brother of Luke Smallbone and younger brother of Christian recording artist and speaker Rebecca St. James. Smallbone is also the brother-in-law of Jacob Fink, former bassist for the band Foster the People.

Smallbone's father was a music promoter, and Joel recalls, "going to these rock concerts, sitting on my father's shoulders, plugging my ears...Honestly, in a lot of ways I feel like music chose me and as I grew older, I made a clear decision to fully lean into it."

Career

Smallbone did background vocals for his sister Rebecca as well as operating lights and managing the stage. He collaborated with his brother Luke and in 2008 they released their first EP, A Tale of Two Towns, performing under the name Austoville. The group was signed to Warner Bros. Records and later changed its name to For King & Country.

Smallbone began his acting career in 2014 by playing King Xerxes in The Book of Esther and as Jake Reeson in Like a Country Song. In 2016, Smallbone was cast in the leading role of James Stevens in the film Priceless.

Smallbone won two Grammy awards in 2014 and was nominated for another Grammy in 2016

Discography

Filmography

References

External links 
 

Living people
Australian musicians
Australian male actors
1984 births